Events from the year 1664 in art.

Events
 Approximate date - Isaac Fuller executes ceiling paintings in chapel of All Souls College, Oxford, England.

Paintings

 Frans Hals - Regents of the Old Men's Almshouse
 Claude Lorrain - Landscape with Psyche outside the Palace of Cupid (The Enchanted Castle)
 Daniel Schultz - Crimean Falconer of King John II Casimir with his Family
 Willem van de Velde the Younger - The Dutch Fleet in the Goeree Straits (Guinea)
 Samuel Dirksz van Hoogstraten - Trompe-l'œil Still Life

Births
May 20 - Andreas Schlüter,  German baroque sculptor and architect in the Petrine Baroque style (died 1714)
June 3 - Rachel Ruysch, Dutch artist who specialized in still-life paintings of flowers (died 1750)
December 26 - Johann Melchior Dinglinger, one of Europe's greatest goldsmiths, German artist in a Mannerist tradition into the "Age of Rococo" (died 1731)
date unknown
Giuseppe Alberti, Italian painter (died 1716)
Ferrante Amendola, Italian historical painter (died 1724)
Juan Bautista Bayuco, Spanish religious-themed painter (died unknown)
Giacomo Bolognini, Italian painter 1734)
Philipp Ferdinand de Hamilton, painter from the Southern Netherlands active in Austria (died 1750)
Guglielmo da Leoni, Italian painter and engraver (died 1740)
Rolando Marchelli, Italian painter from Genoa (died unknown)
Alessandro Marchesini, Italian painter of allegories with small figures (died 1738)
Mehmet Emin Tokadi, Ottoman Sufi saint, writer, calligrapher, and scholar (died 1745)
Pablo González Velázquez, Spanish Baroque painter (died 1727)
probable - Torii Kiyonobu I, Japanese painter and printmaker in the ukiyo-e style, especially on Kabuki signboards (died 1729)

Deaths
February John Hoskins, English miniature painter (date of birth unknown)
April 4 - Adam Willaerts, Dutch painter (born 1577)
April 15 - Lorenzo Lippi, Italian painter and poet (born 1606)
May 5 - Giovanni Benedetto Castiglione, Italian painter (born 1609)
May 11 - Salomon de Bray (or Braij), Dutch painter (born 1597)
July 12 - Stefano della Bella, Italian printmaker known for etchings of many subjects, including military ones (born 1610)
August 3 - Jacopo Vignali, Florentine painter (born 1592)
August 27
Cornelis Pietersz Bega (the "Little Master"), Dutch painter, etcher and draughtsman (born 1631)
Francisco de Zurbarán, Spanish painter (born 1598)
date unknown
Jan Pieter Brueghel, Flemish Baroque painter (born 1628)
Michel Corneille the Elder, French painter, etcher, and engraver (born 1601)
Jacob Heinrich Elbfas, Livonia-born portraitist (born 1600)
probable
Lan Ying, Chinese painter of landscapes, human figures, flowers and birds during the Ming Dynasty (born 1585)
(died 1664/1673) Antonio Maria Vassallo, Italian painter of mythological scenes and still lifes (born 1620)
Reinier Nooms, Dutch maritime painter and etcher (born c. 1623)

References

 
Years of the 17th century in art
1660s in art